Shah Abbas Mosque can refer to:

 Juma Mosque in Ganja, Azerbaijan
 Shah Abbas Mosque in Tbilisi, Georgia (demolished in 1950)
 Shah Abbas Mosque in Yerevan, Armenia (formerly)